B is a service on the S-train network in Copenhagen. It runs between Farum and Høje Taastrup and provides stopping services on the S-train system's Farum radia and Tåstrup radial.

B is one of the base services on the network, running every 20 minutes from about 5:00 to 1:00 every day, and every 10 minutes between about 6:00 to 19:00 on weekdays. On Friday and Saturday nights there is also a 30 minutes service throughout the night.

History
Since the first part of the Taastrup radial opened in 1953, letter B has been used for its principal service. Before that the characteristic of service B was that it was the stopping trains to Holte.

Bb, L, B+
From 1972 to 1979, the service on the Taastrup branch was supplemented on weekdays by service E (q.v.). In 1979 a separate daytime reinforcement service Bb was created; it ran every 20 minutes with a 10-minute offset to service B such that the Tåstrup radial effectively had a 10-minute frequency. Under the timetable doctrine followed in those years, a service letter such as B could not be used for more than exactly 3 trains an hour, so a separate service designation was needed for these daytime supplements. They later changed their name to L and then to B+, and were finally folded into B with the 2007 timetable.

Bx
Rush-hour supplements for B ran from 1955:

References

S-train (Copenhagen)